Cheerharan is a Nepali mythological novel by Neelam Karki Niharika. It was published in 2016 by Sangri-La Books. It is the ninth book of the author. The book won the Padmashree Sahitya Puraskar in the same year. It is a retelling of the Mahabharata epic. The novel shows the pain suffered by women in the political and social environment in the epic. Karki has presented the views of various females characters such as Satyawati, Kunti, Ambika, Ambalika, Gandhari, etc. in this book unlike the epic which is mostly male-centered.

Synopsis 
Cheerharan is a retelling of the infamous humiliation of Draupadi from the Sabha Parva of Mahabharata. During the game of dice, Pandavas place their wife Draupadi for the bet and loses her after which she is humiliated by the Kauravsas. The Kauravas strips her in front of the whole court and Pandavas do nothing to protect her dignity. In the end, Lord Krishna interferes to save her from humiliation. This part is one of the key moments that eventually lead to Mahabarata war. 

The novel draws a parallel on the exploitation of women during that period and the modern age.

Reception 
The book won the Padmashree Sahitya Puraskar for the year 2072 BS. The book was also shortlisted for the prestigious Madan Puraskar for the same year but lost to Ramlal Joshi's Aina. Karki later went on to win the prize for her next novel - Yogmaya.

Rishi Ram Bhusal in his review for The Annapurna Post praised this book as "a valuable addition to Nepali literature".

See also 

 Yogmaya 
 Dumero
 Parityakta
 Aina

References 

21st-century Nepalese novels
2016 Nepalese novels
Padmashree Sahitya Puraskar-winning works
Nepalese novels
Nepali-language novels
Novels based on the Mahabharata